Anini Beach is a beach located on the north shore of Kauai, Hawaii. It is well known for its excellent windsurfing and views of the large coral reef that rings the island. Nearby waters range between four and 100 feet in depth, and the beach is known for strong currents. Anini Beach is dotted by expensive homes, one of which was used for the filming of Honeymoon in Vegas (1992).

Anini means "dwarfish" or "stunted" in Hawaiian.

References

External links
 Save Our Seas -Anini.org

Anini Beach Park Information
 Kauai's safest beach -

Beaches of Kauai